Speed Stick is an American  brand of deodorant/antiperspirant produced by multinational healthcare company Colgate-Palmolive. It was formerly known as "Mennen Speed Stick" prior to Colgate-Palmolive's purchase of The Mennen Company. Currently, the products feature the words "by Mennen" in a small font on the label. Speed Stick comes in both deodorant and antiperspirant forms. Speed Stick is both a sponsor and the official antiperspirant of the NHL.

Speed Stick comes in forms for men and women (Lady Speed Stick) and in stronger "24/7" forms. Both Speed Stick  and Lady Speed Stick are available in Stick and Gel form.

Speed Stick product types include 24/7, Pro, Stain Guard, Irish Spring, and Original.

Sponsors
Speed Stick was promoted on Between Two Ferns with Zach Galifianakis, in which Zach Galifianakis would abruptly cut an interview in half to promote the product.

Speed Stick bought a 30-second commercial on CBS during Super Bowl XLVII.
Since the beginning of 2014, Speed Stick has sponsored NASCAR Sprint Cup Series driver Cole Whitt for at least ten races a year, initially through their GEAR brand until Indianapolis in 2015.  This sponsorship has appeared on the cars of four teams that Whitt has driven for in this time, including Swan Racing, BK Racing, Front Row Motorsports and Premium Motorsports.

See also 
Teen Spirit (deodorant)

References

External links
 Speed Stick
 Lady Speed Stick

Colgate-Palmolive brands
Products introduced in 1963